The 2011–12 A-League was the 35th season of top-flight soccer in Australia, and the seventh season of the Australian A-League soccer competition since its establishment in 2004. At the end of the previous season, the North Queensland Fury were cut from the competition by the governing body, Football Federation Australia, due to financial reasons.

Clubs

Personnel and kits

Transfers

Managerial changes

Foreign players

The following do not fill a Visa position:
1Those players who were born and started their professional career abroad but have since gained Australian Residency (and New Zealand Residency, in the case of Wellington Phoenix);
2Australian residents (and New Zealand residents, in the case of Wellington Phoenix) who have chosen to represent another national team;
3Injury Replacement Players, or National Team Replacement Players;
4Guest Players (eligible to play a maximum of ten games)

Salary cap exemptions and captains

Regular season

Home and away season
The 2011–12 season saw each team play 27 games, host 13 and play 1 regional game over 25 rounds. On 4 January, over 11 hours of soccer was broadcast with all matches aired back to back starting in Wellington and ending in Perth. The season began on 8 October 2011 and concluded on 22 April 2012. All times are local unless otherwise stated.

Round 1

Round 2

Round 3

Round 4

Round 5

Round 6

Round 7

Round 8

Round 9

Midweek Fixture

Round 10

Midweek Fixture

Round 11

Round 12

Round 13

Midweek Round

Round 14

Round 15

Midweek Fixture

Round 16

Midweek Fixture

Round 17

Midweek Fixture

Round 18

Round 19

Round 20

Postponed Round 17 Fixture

Round 21

Round 22

Round 23

Round 24

Round 25

Table of results

Finals series

Semi-finals

Preliminary final

Grand Final

Season statistics

Top scorers

Own goals

Attendances
These are the attendance records of each of the teams at the end of the home and away season. The table does not include finals series attendances.

Updated to the 25 March 2012 note: Adelaide United's lowest crowd was at Bathurst's Carrington Park(NSW) as part of the regional round fixtures.

Top 10 Season Attendances

Discipline
Updated to end of Week 17, 2 February 2012
The Fair Play Award will go to the team with the lowest points on the fair play table at the conclusion of the home and away season.

 Wellington Phoenix's Nick Ward was given a straight red card that was later rescinded by the Match Review Panel.

Awards

End-of-season awards
 Johnny Warren Medal –  Thomas Broich, Brisbane Roar
 NAB Young Footballer of the Year –  Mathew Ryan, Central Coast Mariners
 Nike Golden Boot Award –  Besart Berisha, Brisbane Roar, 19 Goals
 Goalkeeper of the Year –  Mathew Ryan, Central Coast Mariners
 Manager of the Year –  Graham Arnold, Central Coast Mariners
 Fair Play Award – Brisbane Roar
 Referee of the Year –  Jarred Gillett
 Foreign Player of the Year –  Thomas Broich, Brisbane Roar
 Solo Goal of the Year –  Carlos Hernández, Melbourne Victory FC (Melbourne Victory v Central Coast Mariners, 10-Feb-12)

All-Star team
Formation: 3–4–3

See also
2011 Australian football code crowds

Team season articles

 2011–12 Adelaide United season
 2011–12 Brisbane Roar season
 2011–12 Central Coast Mariners season
 2011–12 Gold Coast United season
 2011–12 Melbourne Heart season
 2011–12 Melbourne Victory season
 2011–12 Newcastle Jets season
 2011–12 Perth Glory season
 2011–12 Sydney FC season
 2011–12 Wellington Phoenix season

Notes

References

 
A-League Men seasons
A League
A League
A League